Rear Admiral Mahmoud Abdel Rahman Fahmy (Arabic: محمود عبدالرحمن فهمي) (September 28, 1929 – April 28, 2006), was commander of the Egyptian Naval Forces (September 1969 to October 1972) and vice defense minister from 12 February 1972 to October 24, 1972.  He later served as the first consultant for naval affairs to the president of the Republic of Egypt (Anwar Al Sadat), chief executive officer of the General Egyptian Organization for Naval Transport, chief executive officer of the Egyptian Overseas Navigation Company, board member of the Transport and Communication Sector of the Egyptian National Council for Production, minister of the Egyptian Naval Transport, and consultant to the Middle East International Naval Organization.

He graduated from the Egyptian Naval Academy in 1948 as a second lieutenant and served on various types of naval vessels from 1949 to 1965 before being appointed as head of the Battle Training Sector with the rank of staff naval commodore and subsequently as rear admiral (1969).

Fahmy became the seventh commander of the Egyptian Naval Forces on September 12, 1969, succeeding Vice Admiral Fouad Abu Zikry, who served his first term as commander from June 11, 1967, to September 11, 1969.

References

 The Fourth Round - A Critical Review of 1973 Arab-Israeli War
 The Crossing of the Suez Canal - Lt. General Saad El Shazly - 2003 Revised Edition - American Mideast Research 2003
 Rome News Tribune September 19, 1969
 Navies and Foreign Policy. Ken Booth . New York Crane, Russak, 1977
 Fahmy Obituary
 Alahram Newspaper, May 5, 2006 - Article by Ibrahim Hegazzy
 An Encyclopedic Dictionary of Conflict and Conflict Resolution, 1945-1996. Author: John E. Jessup. Publisher: Greenwood, August 30, 1998 (see page 198)
 Safhah min al-tarikh: Mudhakkirat.  Author: Mahmud °Abd al-Rahman Fahmi.  / 9772810093. Publisher: al-Maktabah al-Akadimiyah; al-Tabah 1 edition (1996)

See also 
Lists of Egyptians
Abu Zikry
Egyptian navy

Egyptian Muslims
Egyptian Navy admirals
1929 births
2006 deaths
Egyptian military leaders